This is a list of games that were cancelled from release on NEC's line of consoles raging from the TurboGrafx-16 to the PC-FX. Some of those games were never released on any platform to begin with, while others had at least one release but were never ported or remade for the platform they were planned for.

Fourth Generation

TurboGrafx-16/PC Engine + TurboExpress / PC Engine GT

TurboDuo / PC Engine Duo

SuperGrafx / PC Engine SG

Fifth Generation

PC-FX

References

NEC